Sarıderesi is a village in the Kurucaşile District, Bartın Province, Turkey. Its population is 281 (2021).

References

Villages in Kurucaşile District